Reggaematic Funk is a 1983 single by Monyaka. It made #83 on the UK Singles Chart.

References

1983 singles
1983 songs